In mathematics, a polyhedral complex is a set of polyhedra in a real vector space that fit together in a specific way.  Polyhedral complexes generalize simplicial complexes and arise in various areas of polyhedral geometry, such as tropical geometry, splines and hyperplane arrangements.

Definition
A polyhedral complex  is a set of polyhedra that satisfies the following conditions:
1.
2.
Note that the empty set is a face of every polyhedron, and so the intersection of two polyhedra in  may be empty.

Examples
 Tropical varieties are polyhedral complexes satisfying a certain balancing condition.
 Simplicial complexes are polyhedral complexes in which every polyhedron is a simplex.
 Voronoi diagrams.
 Splines.

Fans
A fan is a polyhedral complex in which every polyhedron is a cone from the origin.  Examples of fans include:
 The normal fan of a polytope.
 The Gröbner fan of an ideal of a polynomial ring.
 A tropical variety obtained by tropicalizing an algebraic variety over a valued field with trivial valuation.
 The recession fan of a tropical variety.

References 

Polyhedra